In the context of gender, passing is when someone is perceived as a gender or sex other than the sex they were assigned at birth. Historically, this was common among women who served in occupations where women were prohibited, such as in combat roles in the military. For transgender people, it is when the person is perceived as cisgender instead of the sex they were assigned at birth. The person may, for example, be a transgender man who is perceived as a cisgender man.

The appropriateness of the term passing, and the desirability of blending into cisgender society, are both debated within the transgender community. A trans person who is perceived as cisgender may face less prejudice, harassment, and risk of violence, as well as better employment opportunities. This is sometimes termed passing privilege.

Terminology

General
The term passing is widely used but also debated within the transgender community. Trans writer Janet Mock says that the term is "based on an assumption that trans people are passing as something that we are not" and that a trans woman who is perceived as a woman "isn't passing; she is merely being". The GLAAD Media Guide advises that "it is not appropriate" for mainstream media to use the term passing "unless it's in a direct quote". GLAAD's preferred term is "not visibly transgender". Some dislike the use of the terms stealth and passing, based on the argument that these terms imply dishonesty or deception about one's gender identity.

Gender attribution
Gender attribution is the process by which an observer decides which gender they believe another person to be. Once an observer makes an attribution of the person's gender, it can be difficult for the observer to change their mind and see the person as another gender. Gender attribution is used to make initial assumptions about a person to be able to infer other details or aspects about them. In most interactions, one cannot observe others' physical sex characteristics, such as their penis, vagina, or intersex genitals, so therefore must use other visual cues to be able to discern another's gender. This concept can be summarized by the work of SJ Kessler, W McKenna and H Garfinkel, "This not directly visible 'cultural genital' which is expected to be there "exists in a cultural sense if the person is assumed to have it".

Passing/not passing

Passing typically involves a mixture of physical gender cues, for example, hairstyle or clothing, and certain behavioral attributes that tend to be culturally associated with a particular gender.  Many experienced cross-dressers say, regardless of a person's presentation, confidence is more important for passing than the physical appearance.

The failure to pass oneself off as the desired gender is referred to as being "read" or "clocked".

Stealth
The term stealth in its most extreme sense refers to a person who passes as their desired sex or gender at all times and who has broken contact with everybody who knew their gender history. Thus, everybody around them is unaware that they were not always presenting as the current sex or gender, and they are effectively invisible within the population as trans. If a trans person in stealth living also wishes to be sexual, effective sex reassignment surgery would be required. In order to live in stealth, an individual has to be extremely passable.

People may also choose to be stealth in some parts of their lives and not other, disconnected parts (for instance, being stealth at work, but openly transgender amongst friends). To attain the level of gender passing to be stealth is a goal for many who choose to differ from traditional gender. Many transgender individuals find a sense of dignity and full access to their gender by living stealth instead of under the trans subcategory, or feel that they are living the adulthood they envisioned as children back when they did not know the term "trans" or much about its realities. Many in the community fear issues of discrimination and bias due to their transgender identification. According to Gillian Branstetter from the National Center for Transgender Equality, "People privilege the rights of others  how they look". People may feel safer being able to appear as a non-transgender person than if their gender identity was more easily identifiable.

Privilege

Passing privilege is the concept that transgender people face less prejudice when they are perceived as cisgender, including less risk of harassment and violence, as well as better employment opportunities. For those in the transgender community, the ability to pass is held as the standard of sorts to which many people aspire. However, there is a lack of research about the impact that successfully passing has on an individual's societal experience. One study showed that successfully passing can reduce one's likelihood of experiencing homelessness, as well as improve one's experience with homeless shelters; the study found that 11.4% of its transgender/gender non-conforming sample group stated that they had experienced homelessness directly related to their gender identity, and 16.3% indicated they needed to seek new or short-term living arrangements due to their identity. Among those dealing with direct homelessness, those who lacked the ability to pass were more likely to experience a variety of difficulties including harassment from staff and other visitors, difficulties being accepted to and staying in the shelters themselves, and being less likely to seek assistance from shelters in the first place.

Risks of not passing 
The risks of not fully passing for the gender one is presenting as can vary depending on the circumstances. There is a significant difference between drag queens, or those who otherwise dress for performances, and transgender persons. The risks tend to be much higher for those concerned with passing on a fairly constant basis as opposed to those attempting to pass in the limited context of a public or semi-public performance. Being outed by one's physical attributes as a transgender or gender non-conforming individual can negatively impact one's cultural experience, resulting in neglect, abuse, or disownment by one's community. According to data from the U.S. 2015 Transgender survey, 88% of those interviewed were denied "equal treatments and services" as a result of their trans identity. Transgender people face high rates of discrimination and harassment, particularly among trans women of color. Transgender people face high rates of harassment and violence, including sexual, physical, and verbal violence and harassment, sexual objectification, and social stigmatization. The experience of transphobia can also lead to negative impacts on mental health.

Methods

Passing as female
For people assigned male at birth, passing as female typically involves wearing a wig or styling hair in a manner typical of women in their culture, removing or disguising facial hair, and wearing makeup to make the face appear like that of a cisgender woman, altering the body to resemble that of a woman, wearing clothing and accessories deemed to be for women, speaking in a voice that fits their presentation, and adopting feminine mannerisms.

Alterations to make the face and body appear feminine fall into two categories: temporary items that are applied or worn, and medical alterations.

Some forms of breast prostheses are sometimes used. If the clothing being worn will reveal breast cleavage, cleavage enhancement techniques can be used if there is not sufficient breast tissue to form cleavage.

Various methods are used to create a feminine waist–hip ratio, by either reducing the waist size and/or enlarging the hips and buttocks. A garment such as a corset, BodyBriefer or control brief is often used to reduce the apparent waist size and/or to flatten the stomach area. Hip and buttock padding is sometimes used to enlarge the apparent size of the hips and buttocks.

Tucking refers to the practice of hiding the penis and testicles so that they are not visible through tight clothing. The most effective method of tucking involves pushing the testicles up into the inguinal canal. Though this can be uncomfortable or even painful, feminizing hormone replacement therapy can reduce the size of the testicles through atrophy, making tucking easier. Once this is done, the penis is pulled back between the legs and a tight pair of panties, a gaff, or another tight garment is then worn on top to hold everything in place. Tucking is often utilized when wearing more revealing clothing such as leggings or swimwear. For those who have not undergone or do not want to undergo genital reconstruction surgery, the penile crotch protrusion (sometimes known by the slang terms moose knuckle or bulge) can be among the most conspicuous signs of birth sex.

Cosmetic surgery procedures often used by transgender people living full-time as women include breast augmentation, liposuction and buttock augmentation, in addition to facial feminization surgery (FFS). Though the name would imply otherwise, FFS is not necessarily one individual procedure, but often many different procedures performed at the same time. An FFS patient may also elect to undergo blepharoplasty, rhinoplasty, or a tracheal shave, where others may opt for browbone or jaw reduction, hairline lowering, or injection of filler into the cheekbones. The use of female hormones also alters the body, including changing the distribution of body fat, though these changes are less permanent and will reverse if transgender hormone replacement therapy is discontinued.

Passing as male
For transgender men, drag kings, or any person born female trying to pass as male, this may include binding the breasts to create a flat-chested appearance, taking on a more masculine demeanor, and wearing masculine clothing. Baggy or loose clothing is usually preferred because it hides characteristics like breasts and rounded hips.

Packing is generally done on a daily basis for transgender men, sometimes for their entire lives, especially if they do not undergo sex reassignment surgery. For other transgender men or cross-dressing women, packing is done on an as-needed basis for reasons including personal comfort and for drag performances.

The vast majority of packers are made to look and feel like flaccid penises, but recently companies have released medical-quality prosthetics that can be used for both general packing and for sexual activity. This appearance is sometimes sought out in order to accommodate the wearing of varied clothing styles, particularly more revealing clothing, to achieve the appearance of a crotch protrusion, sometimes called a bulge.

Medical-quality prosthetics that can be attached with medical adhesive exist. Prosthetics may also be held in place with clothes, or more rarely by harnesses.

A flat chest is commonly achieved through breast binding, which can be done in many ways. Commercially-made specialty binders are available worldwide, as are binders designed for the treatment of gynecomastia. Both are safe and effective for the compression of breast tissue and allow for normal breathing in most people. Binders should still not be worn for more than eight hours per day, or when exercising/sleeping, even if they are made by a reputable brand.

Safe binders should not flatten the breasts completely, instead shaping them to create the look of pectoral muscles instead of breasts.

Other methods of binding include compression bandages, back braces, tape, modified clothing, very firm sports bras and tight-fitting shirts. These methods are more popular with young people who have not yet come out as trans, or those who have limited financial means.

Binding with duct tape or elastic/compression bandages can cause serious injury and even death due to asphyxia. Bandages can compress the rib cage so greatly as to make normal breathing impossible, as they are meant to wrap tightly around injuries and are not designed to be used for binding. Tape is also ill-advised due to potentially permanent damage to the skin caused by adhesives and the inflexibility of the material, which exposes the wearer to risks similar to those posed by bandages.

History

Historically, there have been circumstances wherein people have impersonated the opposite sex for reasons other than gender identity. The most common reasons for women disguising themselves as men – often called "Passing Women" – were so that they could go into battle as soldiers, or in order to work in male-dominated professions that would not hire women.

Wartime

Reports exist of women doing this in both the American Revolutionary War and the American Civil War. Examples include Mary Anne Talbot and Hannah Snell.

Two of the most famous examples from an earlier era are Hua Mulan, who, according to legend, took her elderly father's place in the Chinese army; and Onorata Rodiani (1403–1452), an Italian mercenary who served as a cavalry soldier, disguised in male clothing and with a male name.

A Spaniard named Eleno de Céspedes, despite being married and pregnant by the age of 16, began identifying as, as well as dressing as, a man. After a first failed attempt, he was accepted into the army to then serve for several years successfully.

Catalina de Erauso was a Spanish woman, originally a nun, who grew increasingly dissatisfied with religious life and in turn decided to dress as a man and flee to a new life. Joining the army a few years later, she did remarkably well in the military. According to source material, "After serving in several campaigns against the Indians of Chile and Peru, she distinguished herself sufficiently to be promoted to the rank of ensign". She reportedly earned a reputation of "courage and daring" while involved in campaigns. However outside of combat she was known to cause trouble frequently. Known for brawling, gambling, fighting, and killing people on a few occasions her issues with violence would eventually lead her to reveal her true sex at what she thought at the time was the end of her life. Although her female identity was revealed later in life, she maintained her masculine appearance until her death.

Hannah Gray was a part of the British army under the name James Gray. Due to various circumstances and issues regarding the reveal of her gender Hannah eventually ended up joining the marines instead. She was noted to have "proved to be not only a brave warrior but a good drinking companion as well and was accepted by her mates as a man", engaging in the construct of masculinity and doing successful masculine gender.

Working-class passing women
In Stone Butch Blues, Leslie Feinberg wrote about working class, butch lesbians in the 1960s who chose to pass as men in order to find jobs that would enable them to support their families. While the 1993 novel is fiction, there are females, including Feinberg, who took testosterone in this era for these reasons. Factory jobs, in particular, usually only paid men a living wage that could also support a partner and children. Some of these passing women later identified as transgender, while others stopped taking hormones and returned to a butch female presentation once gains made by feminists allowed for better employment opportunities.

Upper-class passing men 
Cases of male impersonation by women appear to be more historically common than those of female impersonation of men. Outside of artistic expression, men who attempt to pass as women are not only less common but less socially accepted as a result. Many known male to female cross dressers are those from the upper class who do not face the same socioeconomic risks in repercussion to their cross dressing.

Henri III of France was a historic cross-dresser, noted to dress as the opposite sex at grand parties and events. He was reported to have "dressed as an Amazon" or "wearing a ball gown, makeup, earrings, and other jewelry, and attended by his so called mignons, or homosexual favorites".

Music
American band leader Billy Tipton had a successful career as a jazz musician from the 1930s through the 1970s. Tipton was from the conservative Midwest. The world at large only discovered Tipton was assigned female at birth after his death.

To maintain anonymity while in Bahrain, Michael Jackson wore women's clothes when out in public.

Modern context
In modern times the endeavor of trying to pass is most often practiced by transgender people.

Those performers (drag kings and drag queens) who are open about their natal sex are not typically referred to as "passing", even though some may be able to do so. Many people who cross-dress in public do try to pass. Many transgender people live and work in their gender and seek to be fully accepted as a member of that gender, rather than that which they were assigned. Therefore, passing is not just an option but is seen as a necessity by many.

Other transgender people, including non-binary people, have different attitudes towards passing. For example, they might not try to pass at all, they may engage in genderfuck (sending consciously mixed signals), or they might be able to pass, but do not hide the fact that they are transgender. Personal views on passing and the desire or need to pass are independent of whether an individual has had medical treatment or has legally changed their gender.  Trans writer Mattilda Bernstein Sycamore writes, "If we eliminate the pressure to pass, what delicious and devastating opportunities for transformation might we create?"

In the transgender and crossdressing communities, those that cannot pass may sometimes view those that pass with jealousy. Because of this, there may be a tendency for some of those who pass to avoid those who are easily read. There is the perception among many that when one person is read, anyone with that person will be assumed to be transgender or crossdressing, by association.

The use of the term "passing" regarding sexual orientation denotes "hiding" one's identity, where use among gender-variant people (as described above) signals acceptance and concordance with one's internal sense of or desired gender identity. However, for this reason, and because transgender persons who come to live full-time in their desired gender/sex identity often recognize their previous attempts to conceal their identity and be accepted in socially-accepted and designated roles as the real artifice they constructed and protected, some have begun to instead call their previous gender-normative and concealing behaviour as "passing".

See also

Closeted
Gender-bait
List of transgender-related topics
Mimicry#Inter-sexual mimicry
Minority stress
Passing (racial identity)
Pronoun game
Sexism
Undercover

Notes

External links
 I Did But See Her Passing By

Cross-dressing
Gender transitioning
Passing (sociology)